The 1972 Manila bombings were a series of "about twenty explosions which took place in various locations in Metro Manila in the months after the Plaza Miranda bombing and immediately preceding Ferdinand Marcos' proclamation of Martial Law".  The first of these bombings took place on March 15, 1972, and the last took place on September 11, 1972 - twelve days before martial law was announced on September 23 of that year.

The Marcos administration officially attributed the explosions communist "urban guerillas", and Marcos included them in the list of "inciting events" which served as rationalizations for his declaration of Martial Law.  Marcos' political opposition at the time questioned the attribution of the explosions to the communists, noting that the only suspects caught in connection to the explosions were linked to the Philippine Constabulary.

Explosion incidents 
The sites of the 1972 Manila bombings included the Palace Theater and  Joe's Department Store on Carriedo Street, both in Manila; the offices of the Philippine Long Distance Telephone Company (PLDT), Filipinas Orient Airways, and Philippine American Life and General Insurance Company (PhilamLife); the Cubao branch of the Philippine Trust Company (now known as PhilTrust Bank); the Senate Publication Division and the Philippine Sugar Institute in Quezon City, and the South Vietnamese embassy.

However, only one of these incidents - the one in the Carriedo shopping mall - went beyond damage to property; one woman was killed and about 40 persons were injured.

Suspects

Communist guerillas 
The Marcos regime officially attributed the explosions communist "urban guerillas", referring to the earliest recruits of the Communist Party of the Philippines, which had split from the Partido Komunista ng Pilipinas about five years before.

Government agents 
Opposition senator Ninoy Aquino noted with suspicion that with the Carriedo incident as the only exception, "the bombings had all been timed for maximum publicity and nothing more."  He also noted that "one of the two arrested bombing suspects was a PC (Philippine Constabulary, now the Philippine National Police) sergeant who was employed at the Firearms and Explosive Section of the PC."

See also 
 Martial Law under Ferdinand Marcos
 Proclamation 1081

References 

History of the Philippines (1965–1986)
History of Manila
False flag operations
Presidency of Ferdinand Marcos
Crime in Metro Manila
1972 murders in the Philippines